LNER Class B1 may refer to two different type of steam locomotive operated by the London and North Eastern Railway:

 GCR Class 8C, two locomotives originally classified as B1 but reclassified as B18 in April 1943 to allow the B1 classification to be used for the LNER Thompson Class B1
 LNER Thompson Class B1